Bumper to Bumper is the fourth studio album by American country music artist T. Graham Brown. It was released in 1990 via Capitol Nashville. The includes the singles "If You Could Only See Me Now", "Moonshadow Road" and "I'm Sending One Up for You".

Track listing

Chart performance

References

1990 singles
T. Graham Brown albums
Albums produced by Barry Beckett
Capitol Records Nashville albums